Eben Goddard is a former Lebanon international rugby league footballer who represented Lebanon at the 2000 World Cup.

Background
Goddard was born in Sydney, Australia.

Playing career
Goddard played in the lower grades for the St. George-Illawarra Dragons club. In 2000 he was selected to represent Lebanon in the World Cup through his ancestry. He played in one game at the tournament. In 2002 he moved to the Easts Tigers in the Queensland Cup before retiring.

Later years
Goddard now works as a personal trainer in Brisbane, Queensland.

References

Living people
Australian rugby league players
Lebanon national rugby league team players
Eastern Suburbs Tigers players
Rugby league second-rows
Year of birth missing (living people)
Place of birth missing (living people)